Alakbar Huseynov (July 7, 1961 – August 2, 2007) was an Azerbaijani film, television and theater actor; a puppeteer; comedian; and theater director. He was the former head director of the Baku Puppet Theatre, and was a Honored Artist of Azerbaijan (2000). Huseynov was famous for his comedy roles, but also was the host of the children's television show, Each of Us is a Flower.

Career
Huseynov was born in Baku, Azerbaijan. He graduated from the Azerbaijan State University of Culture and Arts in 1982.  

He started his career in Shaki State Drama Theater. Since 1988 he is an actor of Baku Puppet Theatre; and from 2006 until 2007 he was the director of this theater. In 1994, Huseynov was a laureate of the Humay Award. In 2007, he was awarded with Order of the Smile. 

He died on August 2, 2007 from complications of Hepatitis C.

References

External links
 

1961 births
2007 deaths
Azerbaijani male film actors
Azerbaijani male stage actors
Azerbaijani male television actors
Actors from Baku
Entertainers from Baku